Canet lo Roig is a municipality in the comarca of Baix Maestrat in the Valencian Community, Spain.

The Serra de Sant Pere rises southeast of the town and the Cérvol River flows north of it. The Moles de Xert rise west of Canet, on the right side of the road between this town and Xert.

It is an agricultural town surrounded by cultivated plots, mainly almond, carob and olive trees, as well as some cereal fields. The population of the town is under 900. Canet lo Roig is part of the Taula del Sénia free association of municipalities. Canet lo Roig has its own "village language", like most rural villages, but inhabitants speak Valencian and Spanish.

References

External links 

 Página web de Canet lo Roig
  Ple de l'Ajuntament Canet lo Roig
 Preguntes a l'ajuntament de Canet lo Roig
 Institut Valencià d'Estadística
 Portal de la Direcció General d'Administració Local de la Generalitat
 

Municipalities in the Province of Castellón
Baix Maestrat